Zigmas Pranciškus Jukna (13 July 1935 – 7 October 1980) was a Lithuanian rower. He competed for the Soviet Union at the 1960, 1964 and 1968 Summer Olympics, and finished in second, fifth and third place in the coxed pairs, eights and eights events, respectively. Between 1961 and 1969 he won three gold and five silver medals at European and world championships. Starting from 1971 he worked as a judge with the International Rowing Federation.

In 1962 Jukna graduated from the Lithuanian University of Educational Sciences. He was married to Irena Jukna, also a competitive rower; they had a son. In the late 1970s Jukna was diagnosed with a brain tumor and died in 1980 after two operations.

References

External links
 

1935 births
1980 deaths
People from Šiauliai District Municipality
Lithuanian male rowers
Lithuanian Sportsperson of the Year winners
Medalists at the 1960 Summer Olympics
Medalists at the 1968 Summer Olympics
Olympic bronze medalists for the Soviet Union
Olympic medalists in rowing
Olympic rowers of the Soviet Union
Olympic silver medalists for the Soviet Union
Rowers at the 1960 Summer Olympics
Rowers at the 1964 Summer Olympics
Rowers at the 1968 Summer Olympics
Soviet male rowers
World Rowing Championships medalists for the Soviet Union
Honoured Masters of Sport of the USSR
European Rowing Championships medalists
Lithuanian University of Educational Sciences alumni